Filipe da Silva (born 30 November 1979 in Guimarães) is a Portuguese-French former professional basketball player.

Professional career
In his pro career, he played with the Spanish club CB Villa de los Barrios.

External links
 French LNB profile
 LCB Profile 
 EuroBasket 2007 Profile

1979 births
Living people
Metropolitans 92 players
Shooting guards
Portuguese men's basketball players
French men's basketball players
Sportspeople from Guimarães

French people of Portuguese descent